Paul Ortiz (born 1964) is an American historian. Ortiz is a professor of history at the University of Florida and is Director of the Samuel Proctor Oral History Program.

Life and education
Born in 1964, Paul Ortiz is a third-generation military veteran and a first-generation college graduate. Ortiz served as a paratrooper and radio operator, attaining the rank of sergeant, in the United States Army from 1982 to 1986 with the 82nd Airborne Division and the 7th Special Forces Group in Central America. He received the US Armed Forces' Humanitarian Service Medal for meritorious action in the wake of the eruption of the Nevado del Ruiz stratovolcano in Tolima, Colombia, in November, 1985.

Returning to the United States in 1987, Ortiz worked as a labor organizer with the United Farm Workers of Washington State during the 8-year boycott of Chateau Ste. Michelle Wines, which resulted in a union contract for vineyard workers in 1995 that remains in force to this day. During his time in graduate school at Duke University, Ortiz and Sheila Payne worked as volunteer organizers with the Farm Labor Organizing Committee during its Mt. Olive Pickle Boycott. This struggle resulted in a union contract for farm workers in North Carolina. Ortiz and Payne also served as board members of Student Action with Farmworkers during this time period.

In Gainesville, Ortiz and Sheila Payne have been active in a number of social justice organizations including the Alachua County Labor Coalition, the NAACP, and Gainesville Veterans for Peace, Chapter 14.

Ortiz has served as president and a council member of the United Faculty of Florida UF-FEA/NEA/AFT/ AFL-CIO.

Publications 
Ortiz's publications include Emancipation Betrayed (University of California Press) a history of the Black Freedom struggle in Florida, and Remembering Jim Crow: African Americans Tell About Life in the Jim Crow South (New Press). His book awards include the Lillian Smith Book Prize, the Harry T. and Harriett V. Moore Book Prize, and a PEN Oakland Josephine Miles Literary Award. His published essays appear in a wide array of publication venues and types, including Latino Studies, The Oral History Review, Radical History Review, Truthout, Against the Current, Southern Exposure, and popular press in writings about African American and Latino histories and politics. His essay on the radical black abolitionist Henry Highland Garnet (1815-1882) was published in Time Magazine online in 2018.

Ortiz has also published pieces on social movement icons such as Stetson Kennedy and Laura Dixie, an organizer of the 1956 Tallahassee Bus Boycott. Mrs. Dixie was known as "The Mother of the Movement" in Tallahassee. 

Ortiz's work on the 1920 Ocoee, Florida Election Day Massacre has been widely cited in academic and popular media.

Ortiz is currently working on three new books: "Settler Colonialism and the ‘War on Terror’: 1492 to the Present," which will be published by Beacon Press He is also co-editing a book on social movement history with Wesley Hogan of Duke University titled "Changing the System Now: People Power, History, and Organizing in the 21st Century," which includes contributions by William Greider, Lane Windham, Ernie Cortes and other activist intellectuals. He is currently finishing a synthesis of the segregated South with William H. Chafe titled: "Behind the Veil: African Americans in the Age of Segregation, 1895-1965."

Selected Bibliography 
An African American and Latinx History of the United States (ReVisioning American History, 2018)
Emancipation Betrayed University of California Press (2006)
Remembering Jim Crow by William H. Chafe (Editor), Raymond Gavins (Editor), Robert Korstad (Editor), with Paul Ortíz and others New Press (2008)

Notes

External links
About the Director of the Samuel Proctor Oral History Program

21st-century American historians
21st-century American male writers
Historians of the United States
Historians of African Americans
Historians of the Caribbean
Historians of Latin America
Historians of Mexico
Labor historians
Oral historians
Central America solidarity activists
American anti-war activists
Workers' rights activists
American academics of Mexican descent
University of Florida faculty
Duke University alumni
Evergreen State College alumni
20th-century American military personnel
United States Army soldiers
Hispanic and Latino American military personnel
1964 births
Living people
American male non-fiction writers